

The Aviméta 132 was a French three-engined monoplane transport for eight-passengers designed and built by Aviméta (Société pour la Construction d'Avions Métallique ). It was the first French all-metal aircraft but only one aircraft was built.

Design and development
The Aviméta 132 was a high-wing monoplane with a fixed conventional landing gear, powered by three uncowled  Salmson 9Ab radial air-cooled piston engines. Fuel tanks were built into the wings, fitted with jettison valves to empty the tanks in an emergency. The enclosed cockpit sat two crew with a cabin for eight passengers. It was intended to build both a day and night version but only one aircraft was built and it did not enter production.

Specifications (day version)

References

Further reading
 

1920s French airliners
Trimotors
132
High-wing aircraft